WBXK-CA, VHF analog channel 8, was a low-powered, Class A America One-affiliated licensed to Jackson, Mississippi, United States. The station was owned by the Community Television Network.

History
It began broadcasting on March 16, 1990 as W08CU, and was an over-the-air music-video outlet.

In the 1990s, WBXK was affiliated with the Video Jukebox Network, which was renamed The Box in 1991. The station's "programming" was basically music videos requested by non-cable viewers in the greater Jackson area.

On September 1, 1995, the station's call letters changed from W08CU to WBXK-CA.

In 2001, WBXK remained a music video station even though it inevitably became an MTV2 affiliate (at the time known as M2, which absorbed The Box that year).

In mid-January 2005, WBXK had switched to an all-informercial format for about two weeks. On February 2, WBXK flipped to Urban America Television, flipping again to its next network, America One, in April 2006.

The station's owners surrendered its license to the Federal Communications Commission on March 29, 2013, at which point the license was cancelled.

BXK-CA
Defunct television stations in the United States
Television channels and stations disestablished in 2013
BXK-CA